Jan van Eijden (born 10 August 1976 in Bad Neuenahr-Ahrweiler, Rhineland-Palatinate) is a German track cyclist born in Bad Neuenahr. He is a double World Champion in sprint and team sprint. He also won one world cup classic and four German national titles.

He retired from active racing in 2006 and worked as a sprint coach for the Great Britain Cycling Team until November 2021.

Major results

1994: 1st in UCI Track World Championships - 1 km time trial (juniors)
1995: 1st in UCI Track Cycling World Championships - team sprint
1996: 3rd in UCI Track World Championships - 1 km time trial
1997: 3rd in German national track cycling championships - sprint
1997: 2nd in UCI Track World Championships - team sprint
1999: 1st in German national track cycling championships - team sprint
1999: 3rd in German national track cycling championships - sprint
2000: 1st in UCI Track World Championships - sprint
2000: 1st in German national track cycling championships - sprint
2000: 1st in German national track cycling championships - team sprint
2000: 2nd in German national track cycling championships - keirin
2002: 3rd in German national track cycling championships - keirin
2003: 2nd in World cup classic Aguascalientes - keirin
2003: 3rd in World cup classic Cape Town - sprint
2003: 2nd in German national track cycling championships - team sprint
2003: 2nd in German national track cycling championships - sprint
2004: 2nd in World cup classic Aguascalientes - keirin
2004: 3rd in World cup classic Aguascalientes - team sprint
2004: 3rd in World cup classic Manchester - sprint
2004: 2nd in German national track cycling championships - keirin
2004: 1st in German national track cycling championships - sprint
2005: 1st in World cup classic Moscow - team sprint
2005: 2nd in German national track cycling championships - keirin
2005: 2nd in German national track cycling championships - team sprint
2006: 3rd in World cup classic Sydney - keirin

References

1976 births
Living people
People from Bad Neuenahr-Ahrweiler
German male cyclists
Cyclists at the 2000 Summer Olympics
Olympic cyclists of Germany
German cycling coaches
Cyclists from Rhineland-Palatinate
UCI Track Cycling World Champions (men)
German track cyclists